Hippocrene may refer to:

 5085 Hippocrene, an asteroid
 Hippocrene, a spring in Greek mythology
 Hippocrene, a synonym for a genus of hydrozoans, Bougainvillia
 Hippocrene Books, a publisher